The 2009–10 Philippine Basketball Association (PBA) Philippine Cup or known as the 2009–10 KFC PBA Philippine Cup for sponsorship reasons, is the first conference of the 2009–10 PBA season. The tournament started on October 11, 2009, and ended on March 3, 2010. The conference featured Smart Gilas as guest team. The tournament is an All-Filipino format, which doesn't require an import or a pure-foreign player for each team.

Format
The following format will be observed for the duration of the conference:
 Double-round robin eliminations; 18 games per team; Teams are then seeded by basis on win–loss records. Ties are broken among points differences of the tied teams. Guest team Smart Gilas will only compete for the first round of eliminations and result of its games will not reflect on the standings of its opponents.
 Teams seeded #6, #7, #8 and #9 play in a knockout wildcard playoffs for the final berth in the quarterfinals. Matchups are:
 #6 team vs. #9 team
 #7 team vs. #8 team
 Winners of the first round for the last quarterfinal berth.
 #3, #4 and #5 teams automatically advance to the best of five quarterfinals:
 #3 team vs. winner of wildcard playoffs
 #4 vs. #5 teams
 #1 and #2 teams automatically advance to the best of seven semifinals:
Winner of first quarterfinal vs. #1
Winner of second quarterfinal vs. #2
The winners in the semifinals advance to the best of seven Finals. The losers dispute the third-place trophy in a one-game playoff.

Elimination round

Team standings

Schedule

Results

Bracket

Wildcard phase

First round

Second round

Quarterfinals

(3) Purefoods vs. (6) Rain or Shine

(4) Barangay Ginebra vs. (5) Talk 'N Text

Semifinals

(1) Alaska vs. (4) Barangay Ginebra

(2) San Miguel vs. (3) Purefoods

Third place playoff

Finals

References

External links
 PBA.ph

PBA Philippine Cup
Philippine Cup